Histiaea or Histiaia may refer to:

Histiaea (mythology), a daughter of Hyrieus, from whom the town of Histiaea, in Northern Euboea, was said to have derived its name
Oreus or Histiaea, an ancient city on the northwest coast of Euboea
Hestiaea (Attica), a deme/township of ancient Attica

See also
Histiaeotis, a district of ancient Thessaly